Beijing Galloping Horse Group is a Chinese film and television production company that invests in film and television production, acting agent, advertisement, magazine and other fields of operation.

Productions
Including co-productions

Film
Mulan (2009)
Just Another Pandora's Box (2010)
Reign of Assassins (2010)
Eternal Moment (2011)
The Crossing (TBA)

Television
Sigh of His Highness (2006)
Three Kingdoms (2010)

See also
Digital Domain

References

Film production companies of China
Television production companies of China
Chinese brands